Aurora Clavel (born August 14, 1936) is a Mexican film and television actress who is noted for her roles in the movies Tarahumara (1965) and Once Upon a Scoundrel (1973), as well as in numerous telenovelas. For example, she played Mama Lupe in Mariana de la Noche. She belongs to the last decade of the Golden Age of Mexican cinema and to the last decade of the Classical Hollywood cinema.

Selected filmography

 Carnaval en mi barrio (1961) - Bailarina indígena (uncredited)
 Rosa Blanca (1961) - Pueblerina
 El Tejedor de Milagros (1962) - Jacinta
 Tiburoneros (1963) - Esposa de Rubén
 Las dos galleras (1964)
 Los amores de Marieta - Los Fabulosos 20s (1964)
 El mundo de las drogas (1964) - Campesina quemada
 Major Dundee (1965) - Melinche
 Tarahumara (1965) - Belén
 La Soldadera (1966) - Victoria
 ¡Viva Benito Canales! (1966) - Chelito
 Rage (1966) 
 Rancho solo (1967)
 Guns for San Sebastian (1968)
 El bastardo (1968)
 Le Rapace (1968) - Aurora
 Dr. Satán y la magia negra (1968)
 The Wild Bunch (1969) - Aurora
 La maestra inolvidable (1969)
 La constitución (1970, TV series) - Indígena yaqui
 Los juniors (1970) - Tina
 Soldier Blue (1970) - Indian Woman
 The Bridge in the Jungle (1971) - Aurelia
 Lucía Sombra (1971, TV Series) - Señora de Ravel
 Bang bang al hoyo (1971)
 El carruaje (1972, TV series) - Woman
 Chanoc contra el tigre y el vampiro (1972) - Flor de loto
 Mi niño Tizoc (1972) - Maestra
 The Wrath of God (1972) - Señora Moreno
 National Mechanics (1972) - Mujer del sábanas
 Los Cachorros (1973)
 Pat Garrett and Billy the Kid (1973) - Ida Garrett
 El principio (1973) - Madre soldadera
 Once Upon a Scoundrel (1974)
 Auandar Anapu (el que cayó del cielo) (1975) - Lamadre
 The House in the South (1975) - Jacinta
 ¿No oyes ladrar los perros? (1975) - Made de José
 Chicano (1976)
 Somo del otro Laredo (Chicanos Go Home) (1977) - La mestiza (Chonita)
 Mariachi - Fiesta de sangre (1977) - Magdalena Vargas
 Deseos (1977)
 Los amantes frios (1978) - Evodia (segment "El Soplador del vidrio")
 Yara (1979, TV Series)
 Los Ricos También Lloran (1979, TV Series) - Chole Lopez (1979)
 Fuego negro (1979) - Nanny
 Oficio de tinieblas (1981) - Nana Teresa
 Mi nombre es Sergio, soy alcohólico (1981) - Judith
 Vanessa (1982, TV Series) - Marga
 En el país de los pies ligeros (1982)
 Mundo mágico (1983)
 Hombres de tierra caliente (1983)
 El asesino (1983)
 Vivir un poco (1985, TV Series) - Andrea's secretary
 The Mosquito Coast (1986) - Mrs. Maywit
 Los lavaderos II (1987)
 Rosa salvaje (1988, TV Series) - Madre de Ernesto
 El pecado de Oyuki (1988, TV Series) - Nanae
 Pedro infante vive? (1991) - Mujer con Infante
 Milagro de Vietnam (1992)
 Mariachi (1993)
 Vagabunda (1994) - Aniceta
 El hombre de Blanco (1994) - María
 La vibora (1995)
 Sucedió en Garibaldi (1995) - Rocío
 Te sigo amando (1996, TV Series) - Tránsito
 María Isabel (1997, TV Series) - Amargura
 Abrazame muy fuerte (2000, TV Series) - Vicenta
 Atrévete a olvidarme (2001, TV Series) - Eduarda
 Mariana de la Noche (2003, TV Series) - Mamá Lupe
 Contra viento y marea (2005, TV Series) - Ocumé
 Alborada (2005, TV Series) - Cleotilde
 Pasión (2007, TV Series) - La nana de Claudio y Ángel
 Fuego en la sangre (2008, TV Series) - Ofelia
 Espiral (2008) - Luvina
 Cuidado con el ángel (2008, TV Series) - Fermina
 Soy tu dueña (2010, TV Series) - Doña Angustias
 Rafaela (2011, TV Series) - Refugio
 Como dice el dicho (2012–2014, TV Series) - Viviana / Lucinda
 Las paredes hablan (2012) - Doña Luz
 Mentir para vivir (2013, TV Series) - Eduviges
 Corazon indomable (2013, TV Series) - Serafina
 Yo no creo en los hombres (2014-2015, TV Series) - Chelo
 La Habitación (2016) - Genoveva
 La candidata (2017, TV Series)

References

External links
 

1936 births
Living people
Mexican film actresses
Mexican television actresses
Mexican telenovela actresses
People from Oaxaca